Gigondas is a commune in the Vaucluse département in the Provence-Alpes-Côte d'Azur region in southeastern France.

Geography
Gigondas lies in between Vacqueyras and Sablet at the foot of the Dentelles de Montmirail mountains.

Wine
While the village was known for its 'eau purgative de Montmirail' in the 19th century, it is now known for wines. Gigondas AOC wine is produced in Gigondas.

See also
Communes of the Vaucluse department

References

Communes of Vaucluse